Limda or Hanubha na Limda, literally Hanubha's Limda, is a former Rajput talukdari in Gohilwar prant of Saurashtra peninsula in Gujarat, western India. It was held by Gohil Rajputs Clan and its ruler held title of Darbar saheb. 1901 it comprised the town and four more villages, with a combined population of 2,194, yielding 28,000 Rupees revenue (1903-4, mostly from land).

Shaktisinh Gohil, of the Limda family, is an Indian politician, currently serving as Member of Parliament, Rajya Sabha. He is national spokesperson of All India Congress Committee, presidium of Indian National Congress and AICC in-charge for the state of Bihar and Delhi. Gohil is considered most prominent face of party in state of Gujarat. Gohil is a former Minister of health, education and finance.

History
The talukdari in Gohilwar prant was established by Hanubha Gohil, third son of Lakhaji III, 16th Thakor Saheb of Lathi.  Hanubha and his brothers Fatehsinh and Ajabha were given estate of Ingorala after death of Lakhajiraj. They were able to wrest control of Limda and neighboring villages from their Kathi rulers, thus expanding control over total five villages. Their descendants held estates here until the abolition of jagirs by The Bombay Merged Territories and Areas (Jagirs Abolition) Act of 1953.

The last ruler of Limda Darbar saheb shri Ranjitsinhji Bhavsinhji Gohil played an active role in the liberation of Junagadh from  Nawab during Arz-I-Hukumat movement. He was a Member of the Legislative Assembly (India)(1967) from Gadhada assembly constituency.

Rulers

The family were members of the Gohil Dynasty of Rajputs.

Notable personalities

Gohil Hanubha, first holder of the Limda estate. He was martyred on battlefield fighting against Kathi forces. He is worshipped as local deity. The seat of the estate is known as Limda hanubha na literally Hanubha's Limda. 
Gohil Fatehsinhji, younger brother of Hanubha first talukdar of Limda. He was martyred on battlefield fighting against Kathi forces. He is worshipped as local deity.
Gohil Ranjitsinhji- Last talukdar of Limbda and Independence activist who played an important role in arz-I-Hukumat movement that led to liberation of Junagadh. He was also an MLA representing Gadhada assembly constituency in 1967. Umrala Rajput samaj dedicated local community hall to him, naming it ‘Ranjeetsinhji Gohil Limda Bapu Bhavan’.
Shaktisinh Gohil- Indian Politician currently serving as Member of Parliament, Rajya Sabha. He is General secretary of  All India Congress Committee, party in-charge for state of Bihar and National spokesman of Indian National Congress.  He has been elected to Gujarat Legislative Assembly for five times and served as Minister in Gujarat Cabinet during  two consecutive Congress governments from 1990 to 1995. He was Leader of Opposition in Gujarat Legislative Assembly from 2007 to 2012.

See also
 Lathi State

References

External links
 Imperial Gazetteer, on DSAL.UChicago.edu - Kathiawar